Ascent of the Blessed is a Hieronymus Bosch painting made between 1505 and 1515.

It is located in the Gallerie dell'Accademia in Venice, Italy. This painting is part of a polyptych of four panels entitled Visions of the Hereafter. The others are Terrestrial Paradise, Fall of the Damned into Hell and Hell.

Formal analysis
The most intriguing element of this painting is the large tunnel at the top of the panel. It appears from the perspective of looking through a straw and into the heavenly beyond. As Stephen Hitchens writes, it could also be described as a “funnel of goodness and light [as] a source of variety and surprise capturing the visionary and ecstatic union with God.” The three dimensional tunnel gives the viewer a peek of the “white light” from Heaven with three figures waiting at the end for the blessed. The near side of the tunnel has one angel carrying a human soul towards the pearly gates. The viewer can differentiate the two figures because one has a white robe with wings and the other is naked, thus a soul and an angel. Both have their hands in prayer formation.

Right beneath the tunnel, there is an array of angels helping blessed human souls towards salvation. In the lower parts of the panel there are two angels per one soul, suggesting that some humans need more help than others. As it gets closer to the top of the panel, there is a one to one ratio of angel and soul. This might symbolize that the human souls that are pulled from Earth's gravity and towards the tunnel become lighter in weight. The angels have their hands either on the human body carrying it upwards or near the body simply guiding it where to go. All the figures in the painting are looking upwards towards the tunnel.

All the characters have similar facial features because the physical aspect of the humans and angels are more idealized and not individualized. The figures are not meant to look like specific individual people. The style of the hair is also quite idealized; the angels have long wavy hair and the souls have short hair. None of the human souls have organs to help differentiate whether they are male or female. This could be a form of symbolism which shows that there are no genders in Heaven. This could be implying that all human souls are no longer differentiated by sexual organs and everyone is the same. The angels have a multitude of different colored robes and wings, such as subtle reds, blues, and greens.

The painting as a whole is very dimly lit which contrasts with the white brightness at the end of the tunnel. The light at the end of the tunnel is not the light that lights up the bottom of the painting, which is most likely the earthly realm. The extreme darkness directly around the tunnel indicates that the heavenly light has nothing to do with the light coming from below. The areas outside the tunnel are dark and gray. The light actually becomes darker as it moves upwards then when it reaches the tunnel there is a sudden eruption of light. Coincidentally, this painting of the funnel has been known to look very similar to people who have had near-death experiences. During the fifteenth-century, the entrance to paradise was depicted as a funnel which appeared in many miniatures. The shape of the radiant funnel actually has some resemblance to contemporary zodiac diagrams but Bosch transforms it into a shining corridor through which the blessed approach God.

Historical context
Bosch's paintings reflect the religious themes that dominated art and society in the Netherlands during the sixteenth century, especially the Catholic religion. Almost everyone's duty was to behave and act like a good Catholic so that they could ascend into heaven. The consequences of sin were made so awful to frighten the faithful obedience into people with the ultimate punishments of weakening in purgatory and being sent to Hell. According to Reuterswärd, the limited number of people being admitted into Heaven “illustrates the remarkable specification contained in a treatise entitled Van der Vorsieningkeit Godes, which circulated in the Netherlands in Bosch’s time, that out of 30,000 souls only two were likely to reach Heaven.” Whether Bosch read this treatise will never be known for sure, however it is known that there was a high number of monks and nuns that lived in his home city. It was even called “a pious city” because of its high quantity of confraternities and religious houses.

Arrangement of polyptych
Bosch scholars have other interpretations about the meaning behind these paintings, especially Ascent of the Blessed. The panels may come off straight forward and simple but there is a lot of dispute about the order of the panels and how they should be positioned in a museum. When hung in Venice in 2011, the order of the panels was Fall of the Damned into Hell, Hell, space, Terrestrial Paradise, and Ascent of the Blessed. The Terrestrial Paradise was placed on the left because it resembles other Eden panels by Bosch, especially with its landscape, fountain, and following biblical convention. There is also confusion on whether the Terrestrial Paradise  is even “paradise” because it might also be Purgatory. Another possible arrangement is Ascent, Paradise, Hell and the Fall which takes inspiration from Matthew 25: 32–3 in the Bible. The idea is that traditionally; God directs the damned to Hell on his left side.  The Bosch scholar, Ludwig von Baldass, does not mention any other possible arrangements and feels that “the wings are divided into two portions, one above the other, representing on the left the figures of the saved being escorted by angels into Paradise and on the right the fall of the damned into Hell.  Some scholars believe that Visions of the Hereafter are the wings to a missing middle panel which would presumably be the Last Judgement.

Critics are not unanimous in attributing these panels to Bosch, however it would be difficult to ascribe their compositions to anyone else.  There is also speculation about how these designs came to surface through Bosch, whether they are simply just from his mind or dreams. During the sixteenth-century many people would attempt to stimulate themselves into spiritual awakening to get as close to God as possible. Thus, these might have been some of the visions people saw when attempting to jump into the unconscious depth and mystery of the spiritual visions.

References
Baldass, Ludwig von. Hieronymus Bosch. New York: Harry N. Abrams, 1960.
Gibson, Walter S. Hieronymus Bosch. London: Thames and Hudson, 1973.
Hitchins, Stephen Graham. Art as History, History as Art. Belgium: Brepols Publishers, 2014.
Reuterswärd, Patrik. “Hieronymus Bosch’s Four “Afterlife” Panels in Venice.” Artibus et Historiae 12, no. 24 (November 24, 1991): 29–35.

Notes

Angels in art
Paintings by Hieronymus Bosch
Paintings in Venice
1500s paintings
1510s paintings